The Legendary 1979 No Nukes Concerts is a live album and concert film by Bruce Springsteen and the E Street Band, released on November 19, 2021. It was recorded over two nights, September 21 and 22, 1979, at Madison Square Garden, as part of the No Nukes concerts organized by activist group Musicians United for Safe Energy (MUSE) against the use of nuclear energy.

Most tracks are from Darkness on the Edge of Town (1978) and its predecessor, Born to Run (1975), while the album also includes performances of "The River" and "Sherry Darling" preceding their release in studio form on the following year's The River (1980). Springsteen's "Detroit Medley" and his cover of Maurice Williams and the Zodiacs' "Stay" were previously released in a different form on the 1980 album No Nukes: The Muse Concerts for a Non-Nuclear Future.

Critical reception

On review aggregator Metacritic, the album has a score of 93 out of 100 based on six critics' reviews, indicating "universal acclaim". Reviewing the album for Pitchfork, Stephen Thomas Erlewine said the audio recording and accompanying film "flesh out a pivotal moment in Springsteen's rise to superstardom, providing the first professionally recorded and filmed glimpse of the E Street Band at full roar", complimenting the set list for being "structured like a party" and concluding that Springsteen's other performances over the years "haven't diminished the power of this one: It has a distinctive blend of magic and might, the sound of a band who knows they've hit their stride and still gets giddy at the noise they make".

Track listing
Tracks 1–5, 10 and 12 were recorded on September 22, 1979, while tracks 6–9, 11 and 13 were recorded on September 21, 1979. All tracks are written by Bruce Springsteen, except where noted.

Personnel
Musicians
 Bruce Springsteen – guitar, harmonica, vocals
 Roy Bittan – piano
 Clarence Clemons – tenor and baritone saxophones, percussion, backing vocal
 Danny Federici – organ, glockenspiel
 Garry Tallent – bass
 Stevie Van Zandt – guitar, backing vocal
 Max Weinberg – drums
Additional musicians on "Stay"
 Jackson Browne – co-lead vocal
 Tom Petty – co-lead vocal
 Rosemary Butler – backing vocal
Technical personnel
 Bruce Springsteen – production
 David Hewitt and crew – live recording
 Bob Clearmountain – mixing
 Brandon Duncan – assistant engineer, music editor
 Bob Ludwig – mastering
 Rob Lebret – sound engineer
 Shari Sutcliffe – music contractor
 Michelle Holme – art direction, design
 Joel Bernstein – front and back cover photography
 Richard E. Aaron, Joel Bernstein, David Gahr, Lawrence Kirsch, Peter Simon – all other photography
Film credits
 Bruce Springsteen – executive producer
 Jon Landau, Barbara Carr, Thom Zimmy – producers
 Bob Clearmountain – music mixing
 Thom Zimmy – editing
 Haskell Wexler – original cinematography

Charts

Weekly charts

Year-end charts

References

2021 live albums
Bruce Springsteen live albums
Concert films
Columbia Records live albums
Albums recorded at Madison Square Garden